Codling ("little cod") may refer to:

 Little cod, particularly the Atlantic cod (Gadus morhua)
 Some morids, which resemble small cod
 Codling, a surname
 Codling moth
 Yakovlev Yak-40 (NATO reporting name: Codling), a three-engined jet airliner